These are the Knights of the Order of the Elephant (since 1900) :

By reign 
Persons in bold characters are alive members

King Christian IX of Denmark 
1863-1879 : in development ...
 15 November 1863: Prince Valdemar of Denmark
 16 November 1863: Edward VII, King of United Kingdom and Ireland
 9 March 1864: Prince Johann of Schleswig-Holstein-Sonderburg-Glücksburg
 18 April 1864: Luís I, King of Portugal
 11 October 1864: Count Sergei Stroganov, Russia General
 13 October 1864: Prince Julius of Schleswig-Holstein-Sonderburg-Glücksburg
 11 March 1865: Louis Napoleon, Imperial Crown Prince of France (1856–1879)
 29 June 1865: Alexander III, Grand Duke then Tsar of Russia (Alexander II's 2nd son)
 9 January 1866: Leopold II, King of the Belgians
 11 January 1866: Maximilian I of Mexico
 16 May 1866: Edouard Drouyn de Lhuys, Foreign Minister of France (1848–1849, 1851, 1852–1855, 1862–1866) °
 14 June 1866: Vladimir Alexandrovich, Grand Duke of Russia (Alexander II's 3rd son)
 17 June 1866: Alexei Alexandrovich, Grand Duke of Russia (Alexander II's 4th son)
 26 October 1866: Count Vladimir Adlerberg, Russian Minister of the Imperial Court
 26 October 1866: Count Andrej Shuvalov (ru) , Grand Marshal of the Court of Russia
 26 March 1867: Prince George, Duke of Cambridge
 1 May 1868: António José de Ávila, Prime Minister of Portugal
 12 August 1868: William, Prince of Orange, Crown Prince of the Netherlands (William III's son)
 1 September 1868: Nicholas Nikolaevich, Grand Duke of Russia (Nicholas I's 3rd son)
 1 September 1868: George, Duke of Mecklenburg-Strelitz (Grand Duke George's 2nd son &  Frederick VII of Denmark's brother-in-law)
 16 September 1868: Count Georg Meyendorff (ru) , Russian Generalløjtnant
 4 May 1869: Patrice Mac-Mahon, Former Marshal of France, President of France (1873-1879) °
 28 July 1869: Gustaf Sparre (justitiestatsminister), Marshal of the Realm
 28 July 1869: Carl Wachtmeister, Foreign Minister of the United Kingdoms of Sweden and Norway
 2 October 1871: Frederick William III, Landgrave of Hesse
 22 March 1873: Friedrich I, Duke of Anhalt
 2 August 1873: Prince Arthur, Duke of Connaught and Strathearn, Prince of the United Kingdom
 19 August 1873: Frederick III, German Emperor
 24 November 1873: Rudolf, Crown Prince of Austria-Hungary
 5 March 1874: Axel Gustaf Adlercreutz, Minister of Justice (Sweden)
 22 June 1874: Gustaf V, King of Sweden (1907–50), formerly Prince of Sweden (and Norway), Duke of Värmland (Oscar II's elder son)
 4 July 1874: Alexander, Prince of Orange, Crown Prince of the Netherlands (William III's son)
 25 June 1875: Konstantin Konstantinovich of Russia, Grand Duke of Russia (Konstantin Nikolayevich's 2nd son)
 4 July 1875: Alfred of Saxe-Coburg-Gotha, Duke of Edinburgh, Prince of United Kingdom and Ireland
 1 November 1875: Philippe, Prince of Belgium, Count of Flanders
 20 November 1875: Prince Alexander of Hesse and by Rhine
 22 January 1876: Louis, duc de Decazes, Foreign Minister of France (1873–1877) °
 8 April 1876: Friedrich Ferdinand, Duke of Schleswig-Holstein
 23 April 1876: William IV, Grand Duke of Luxembourg
 3 August 1876: Sergei Alexandrovich, Grand Duke of Russia (Alexander II's 5th son)
 3 August 1876: Paul Alexandrovich, Grand Duke of Russia (Alexander II's 6th son)
 3 August 1876: Count Alexander Vladimirovich Adlerberg (ru) , Russian Minister of the Imperial Court
 14 August 1876: Prince Vladimir Andreyevich Dolgorukov (ru) , Governor General of Moscow
 19 August 1876: Dmitry Milyutin, Minister of War of Russia
 24 April 1877: Frederick I, Grand Duke of Baden
 8 January 1878: Alfonso XII, King of Spain
 14 June 1878: Albert of Saxony, King of Saxony
 1 July 1878: Charles Alexander, Grand Duke of Saxe-Weimar-Eisenach
 23 September 1878: Louis IV, Grand Duke of Hesse
 16 November 1878: Ernest Augustus, Crown Prince of Hanover
 22 April 1879: Eduard Ivanovich Totleben, Russian General ingenior
 10 May 1879: Carol, Prince of Romania (proclaimed King of Romania in 1881)
 16 November 1879: Konstantin of Hohenlohe-Schillingsfürst, First Grand Hofmeister of Austria-Hungary
 16 November 1879: Franz Folliot de Crenneville, Armourer of Austria-Hungary
 28 November 1879: Wilhelm II, German Emperor
 20 July 1880: Oscar, Prince Bernadotte, formerly Prince of Sweden (and Norway), Duke of Gotland (Oscar II's 2nd son)
 10 September 1881: Michael Nikolaevich, Grand Duke of Russia  (Nicholas I's 4th son)
 19 September 1881: Albrecht, Archduke of Austria-Hungary, Duke of Teschen
 19 May 1882: Milan I, King of Serbia
 28 October 1882: Ernst I, Duke of Saxe-Altenburg
 26 November 1882: Arthur Mohrenheim, Russian envoy in Denmark
 6 July 1883: Alexander I, Prince of Bulgaria (1879–1886)
 31 August 1883: Carl, Prince of Sweden (and Norway), Duke of Västergötland (Oscar II's 3rd son and Queen Astrid's father)
 31 August 1883: Eugen, Prince of Sweden (and Norway), Duke of Närke (Oscar II's 4th son)
 7 October 1883: Carlos I, King of Portugal
 11 October 1883: Albert Victor, Prince of United Kingdom, Duke of Clarence and Avondale
 18 May 1884: Nicholas II, Grand Duke then Tsar of Russia (Alexander III's elder son)
 29 October 1884: Alexander Frederick, Landgrave of Hesse-Kassel
 13 December 1884: Abdul Hamid II, Sultan of the Ottoman Empire
 14 September 1885:  Robert Philippe, Prince of Orléans, Duke of Chartres (Prince Valdemar of Denmark's father-in-law).
 11 October 1885: George V, King of United Kingdom and Ireland
 22 October 1885: (Louis) Philippe, Prince of Orléans, Count of Paris
 28 August 1886: Constantine I, King of Greece, George I's eldest son
 18 May 1887: Mutsuhito, Emperor Meiji of Japan
 30 July 1888: Henry, Prince of Prussia  (Wilhelm II's brother)
 25 August 1888: Alexander August Wilhelm von Pape, Governor of Berlin
 26 September 1888: Christian X, King of Denmark, when he was Christian IX's grandson
 25 October 1888: Nikolay Girs, Foreign Minister of Russia
 15 November 1888: George, Prince of Greece and Denmark, George I's 2nd son
 18 May 1889: Nikola I, Prince of Montenegro (later King of Montenegro)
 18 May 1889: Gustav Kálnoky, Count, Foreign Minister of Austria-Hungary
 21 June 1889: Karl I, King of Württemberg
 9 October 1889: George Alexandrovich, Grand Duke of Russia (Alexander III's 3rd son)
 21 July 1890: Karl Ludwig, Archduke of Austria-Hungary
 3 August 1890: Haakon VII, King of Norway, when he was "Carl, Prince of Denmark"
 18 August 1890: Charles Stephen, Archduke of Austria-Hungary
 7 September 1890: Nicholas, Prince of Greece and Denmark, George I's 3rd son
 18 May 1891: Luitpold, Prince Regent of Bavaria
 5 August 1891: Sadi Carnot, President of France (1887-1894)
 23 September 1891: Victor Emmanuel III, King of Italy, when Crown Prince
 21 December 1891: Illarion Ivanovich Vorontsov-Dashkov, Count, Russian General
 8 January 1892: Chulalongkorn (Rama V), King of Siam (1853-{1868–1910})
 26 May 1892: Louise, Queen Consort of Denmark (Christian IX of Denmark's wife)
 26 May 1892: Friedrich, Archduke of Austria-Hungary, Duke of Teschen
 26 May 1892: Prince Albrecht of Schleswig-Holstein-Sonderburg-Glücksburg (Christian IX of Denmark's nephew)
 26 May 1892: , Grand Hofmarschall of Denmark
 12 May 1893: Johannes Nellemann, Justice Minister of Denmark
 17 July 1894: Frederick Francis III, Grand Duke of Mecklenburg-Schwerin
 28 July 1894: Harald, Prince of Denmark (Christian IX of Denmark's grandson)
 28 July 1894: , Justice of the Supreme Court of Denmark
 24 June 1895: Frederick Charles, Prince of Hessen-Kassel (later King Elect of Finland (1918) )
 7 September 1895: Alexander Mikhailovich, Grand Duke of Russia (Michael Nikolaevich's 4th son)
 5 May 1896: Georg, Prince of Schaumburg-Lippe
 27 July 1897: Vajiravudh (Rama VI), King of Siam (1881-{1910–1925}), when Crown Prince of Siam
 27 July 1897: Svasti Sobhana, Prince of Siam
 3 August 1897: Frederick Francis IV, Grand Duke of Mecklenburg-Schwerin
 6 August 1897: Michael Alexandrovich, Grand Duke of Russia (Alexander III's 4th son)
 18 September 1897: Fredrik von Essen, Marshal of the Realm of Sweden
 13 October 1897: Frederick II, Grand Duke of Baden
 18 November 1897: Nicholas Mikhailovich, Grand Duke of Russia (Michael Nikolaevich's elder son)
 8 April 1898: Niels Frederik Ravn, Marine & Foreign Minister of Denmark
 9 June 1898: John Albert, Duke of Mecklenburg-Schwerin
 9 October 1898: George William, Prince of Hanover and Cumberland
 9 October 1899: Yoshihito, Emperor Taishō of Japan

20th Century 
 6 May 1900: Wilhelm, Crown Prince of Germany and Prussia (Wilhelm II's elder son)
 10 July 1900: Maximilian, Prince of Baden
 7 September 1900: George Mikhailovich, Grand Duke of Russia (Michael Nikolaevich's 3rd son)
 14 September 1900: Frederick, Prince of Schaumburg-Lippe
 1 November 1900: Émile Loubet, President of France (1899-1906) °
 20 July 1901: Alfonso XIII, King of Spain
 12 September 1901: Peter, Count of Oldenburg
 14 July 1902: Friedrich II, Duke of Anhalt, when Hereditary Prince of Anhalt
 6 August 1902: Andrew, Prince of Greece and Denmark (George I's 4th son)
 27 October 1902: Lave Beck-Friis, Swedish envoy to Denmark
 3 April 1903: August zu Eulenburg, Prussian General
 29 August 1903: Friedrich Heinrich, Prince of Prussia (elder son of Albert of Prussia & great-grandson Frederick William III of Prussia)
 31 August 1903: Emperor Gojong of Korea
 28 October 1903: Gustaf VI Adolf, King of Sweden (1950–1973), Pr. of Sweden (and Norway), formerly Duke of Skåne (Gustav V's 1st son)
 3 August 1904: Paul Friedrich, Duke of Mecklenburg(-Schwerin)
 3 August 1904:  (1847-1911)
 19 August 1904: Adolf Friedrich V, Grand Duke of Mecklenburg-Strelitz
 4 March 1905: Gustav, Prince of Denmark
 8 April 1905: Friedrich Wilhelm, Prince of Prussia (3rd son of Albert of Prussia & great-grandson Frederick William III of Prussia)
 10 June 1905: Aage, Prince of Denmark, later Count of Rosenborg
 21 July 1905: Hans von Koester, German Grand Admiral
 17 November 1905: Ernst August III, Duke of Brunswick, when Hereditary Prince of Brunswick (and Hanover)

King Frederik VIII of Denmark 
 16 June 1906: Charles Edward, Duke of Saxe-Coburg and Gotha
 12 August 1906: Axel, Prince of Denmark
 11 September 1906: Conrad Victor Ankarcrona, Grand Master of Stockholm Palace
 31 October 1906: Louise, Queen of Denmark (Fr VIII's Consort), née Princess of Sweden (and Norway)
 19 November 1906: Prince Eitel Friedrich of Prussia (Wilhelm II's 2nd son)
 19 November 1906: Bernhard von Bülow, Chancellor of German Empire
 25 April 1907: Prince Ferdinand of Bavaria
 14 June 1907: Clément Armand Fallières, President of France (1906-1913) °
 3 July 1907: Prince Adalbert of Prussia  (Wilhelm II's 3rd son)
 18 December 1907: Wilhelm, Prince of Sweden (and Norway), Duke of Södermanland (Gustav V's 2nd son)
 8 January 1908: Ferdinand I, King of Romania, when Crown Prince
 12 May 1908: Franz Ferdinand, Archduke of Austria-Hungary
 3 June 1908: 
 8 November 1908: Erik, Prince of Denmark, later Count of Rosenborg
 24 March 1909: Manuel II, King of Portugal
 28 April 1909: Frederick Augustus II, Grand Duke of Oldenburg
 16 July 1909: Vladimir Frederiks, Minister of the Imperial Court
 19 July 1909: Nicholas Nikolaevich, Grand Duke of Russia
 29 July 1909: Christopher, Prince of Greece and Denmark, George I's 5th son
 15 August 1909: George II, King of Greece, Constantine I's eldest son
 23 February 1910: Albert I, King of the Belgians
 20 May 1910: Ferdinand I, Prince of Bulgaria (1887–1908) and Tsar of Bulgaria (1908–1918)
 6 March 1911: Arvid Taube, Foreign Minister of Sweden
 27 March 1911: Johannes Zeuthen Schroll
 7 August 1911: Chakrabongse Bhuvanath, Prince of Siam
 25 December 1911: Viggo, Prince of Denmark, later Count of Rosenborg
 25 January 1912: Vilhelm Thomsen, Danish Linguist

King Christian X of Denmark 
 14 May 1912: Frederick, Crown Prince of Denmark, later King Frederick IX of Denmark
 14 May 1912: Knud, Hereditary Prince of Denmark, Prince of Denmark (until the change in succession law)
 15 June 1912: Prince August Wilhelm of Prussia (Wilhelm II's 4th son)
 26 September 1912: Queen Alexandrine née Mecklenburg-Schwerin (Christian X's wife, only received the order insignia)
 20 November 1912: Erik, Prince of Sweden (and Norway), Duke of Västmanland (Gustav V's 3rd son)
 12 December 1912: Henry, Prince Consort of the Netherlands
 25 February 1913: Prince Oskar of Prussia (Wilhelm II's 5th son)
 25 February 1913: Theobald von Bethmann Hollweg, German Chancellor
 17 March 1914: Prince Edward Albert of United Kingdom, Prince of Wales, later Edward VIII, King of the United Kingdom
 10 May 1914: Prince Arthur of Connaught, Prince of the United Kingdom
 16 May 1914: Raymond Poincaré, President of France (1913-1920) °
 12 February 1919: Hans Niels Andersen
 18 February 1919: Carl Gustaf Mannerheim, Regent and President of Finland
 27 October 1919: Leopold III, King of the Belgians  (At that time : Léopold, Duke of Brabant, Prince of Belgium)
 30 November 1920: Prince Albert of United Kingdom, Duke of York, later George VI of the United Kingdom and Ireland
 8 December 1920: Alexandre Millerand, President of France (1920-resignation 1924) °
 9 June 1921: Prince René of Bourbon-Parma, Prince Valdemar of Denmark's son-in-law.
 13 August 1921: Olav V, King of Norway
 14 November 1921: Epitácio Pessoa, President of Brazil
 31 August 1922: Umberto II of Italy, when Crown Prince of Italy
 5 September 1922: Wilhelmina, Queen of Netherlands (only received the order insignia)
 23 September 1922: Prince George, Duke of Kent, Prince of the United Kingdom
 23 January 1923: Hirohito, Emperor Showa of Japan
 30 October 1923: Tage Reedtz-Thott, Baron, former Council President of Denmark
 20 December 1923: Stanisław Wojciechowski, President of Poland
 24 June 1924: Prince Henry, Duke of Gloucester, Prince of the United Kingdom
 23 August 1924: Duke Adolf Friedrich of Mecklenburg, elected Duke of the United Baltic Duchy (1918)
 24 February 1925: Tomáš Garrigue Masaryk, President of Czechoslovakia
 8 February 1926: Prajadhipok (Rama VII), King of Siam (1893-{1925-1935})
 7 October 1926: Lauri Kristian Relander, President of Finland
 9 November 1926: Charles, Prince of Belgium, Count of Flanders
 12 March 1927 : Gaston Doumergue, President of France (1924-1931) °
 7 August 1927: Paul, King of Greece, Constantine I's 3rd son
 18 October 1928: Kirill Vladimirovich, Grand Duke of Russia
 6 February 1929: Alfonso, Prince of Asturias (Alfonso XIII of Spain's elder son & Juan Carlos's uncle)
 6 February 1929: Infante Jaime, Duke of Segovia (Alfonso XIII of Spain's 2nd son & Juan Carlos's uncle)
 23 March 1929: Louis II, Reigning Prince of Monaco
 7 June 1929: Friedrich Franz, Hereditary Grand Duke of Mecklenburg-Schwerin (nephew of Queen Alexandrine and Christian X)
 26 March 1930: Alexander I, King of Yugoslavia
 26 April 1930: Berthold, Margrave of Baden (Prince Andrew of Greece and Denmark's son-in-law)
 4 June 1930: Paribatra Sukhumbandhu, Prince of Siam
 4 June 1930: Purachatra Jayakara, Prince of Siam
 13 July 1930: Damrong Rajanubhab, Prince of Siam / Thailand
 3 September 1930: Nobuhito, Prince Takamatsu of Japan
 6 October 1930 : Prince Jean, Duke of Guise, Orléanist claimant to the headship of the Royal Family of France &  (Robert's son, 1885)
 25 January 1932 : Paul Doumer, President of France (1931-1932)
 17 March 1932: Christian, Prince of Schaumburg-Lippe (Princess Louise of Denmark's son, so Christian X's nephew)
 4 November 1932: Fuad I, King of Egypt
 17 February 1933 : Albert Lebrun, President of France (1932-de facto 1940) °
 16 June 1933: Gustaf Adolf, Prince of Sweden, Duke of Västerbotten (Gustaf VI Adolf's son and Carl XVI Gustaf's father)
 5 December 1933: Prince Carl Bernadotte, formerly Prince of Sweden, Duke of Östergötland, (Duke of Västergötland's son)
 7 November 1934: Prince Paul of Yugoslavia, Prince Regent of Yugoslavia (9 October 1934 – 27 March 1941)
 26 November 1934: Peter, Prince of Greece and Denmark, Prince George's son
 21 May 1935: Carl Johan, Count Bernadotte of Wisborg, formerly Prince of Sweden, Duke of Dalarna
 21 May 1935: Bertil, Prince of Sweden, Duke of Halland (Gustav VI's 3rd son) NB 24. May 1947: Ingrid of Sweden, Queen of Denmark
 20 January 1937: Rezā Shāh, Emperor of Iran
 24 January 1937: Frederick II, Duke of Schleswig-Holstein, Head of the House of Oldenburg
 24 February 1937: Prince Gorm of Denmark (Christian X's nephew)
 16 April 1938: George, Prince of Denmark,
 19 January 1939: Ernst Augustus IV of Hanover
 16 February 1940: Miklós Horthy, Regent of Hungary
 9 March 1940: Flemming, Prince of Denmark, later Count of Rosenborg
 10 March 1941: Oluf, Prince of Denmark, later Count of Rosenborg
 5 July 1945: Bernard Montgomery, Field Marshal
 15 December 1945: Dwight D. Eisenhower, General, later President of United States
 5 April 1946: Juliana, retired Queen of the Netherlands (only awarded the order insignia)
 5 April 1946: Bernhard, Prince Consort of the Netherlands

King Frederick IX of Denmark (1947-1972) 
 20 April 1947:  Princess Margrethe of Denmark, now Margrethe II of Denmark, Sovereign of the Order
 20 April 1947: Princess Benedikte of Denmark
 20 April 1947: Queen Anne-Marie, former Queen of the Hellenes, Princess of Denmark
 24 May 1947: Ingrid, Queen of Denmark, née Princess of Sweden (only awarded the order insignia)
 17 October 1947: Niels Bohr, Danish Nobel Prize in Physics
16 November 1947: Queen Elizabeth II of the United Kingdom of Great Britain and Northern Ireland (then Princess Elizabeth)
16 November 1947: Prince Philip, Duke of Edinburgh, né Prince Philip of Greece and Denmark
 9 October 1950: Winston Churchill, Prime Minister of the United Kingdom
 17 November 1950: Juho Kusti Paasikivi, President of Finland
 28 November 1950: Vincent Auriol, President of France (1947–1954)
 28 March 1952: Sigvard Bernadotte, Count of Wisborg
 28 November 1952: Chumbhotbongs Paribatra, Prince of Thailand
8 August 1953: HIM Emperor Akihito of Japan
 5 April 1954: Ásgeir Ásgeirsson, President of Iceland
 21 November 1954: Haile Selassie, Emperor of Ethiopia
 21 November 1954: Mekonnen Haile Selassie, Prince of Ethiopia
 21 March 1955: Charlotte, Grand Duchess of Luxembourg
 15 May 1955: René Coty, President of France 
5 March 1957: Prince Mikasa of Japan
 3 September 1957: Urho Kekkonen, President of Finland
21 February 1958: King Harald V of Norway (then Crown Prince)
21 April 1958: King Bhumibol Adulyadej of Thailand
 14 May 1959: Mohammad Reza Pahlavi, Shah of Iran
 3 September 1960: Caroline-Mathilde, Hereditary Princess of Denmark
 4 September 1960: Margaretha, Prinsess of Denmark, born Princess of Sweden
6 September 1960: Queen Sirikit of Thailand
17 February 1961: Count Ingolf of Rosenborg, former Prince of Denmark
 11 March 1961: Eleanor, Countess of Rosenborg
4 January 1962: King Constantine II, former King of the Hellenes
11 March 1962: Princess Elisabeth of Denmark 
 6 June 1962: Adolf Schärf, President of Austria
 23 January 1963: Frederike, Queen of Greece
3 May 1963: Empress Farah, former Empress of Iran
 4 June 1963: Habib Bourguiba,  President of Tunisia
 9 September 1963: Julius Nyerere, President of Tanzania
20 October 1963: Christian, Count of Rosenborg, formerly Prince of Denmark
 20 April 1964: Antonio Segni, President of Italy
11 September 1964: Princess Irene of Greece and Denmark
11 September 1964: Prince Michael of Greece and Denmark
12 January 1965: King Carl XVI Gustaf of Sweden
 5 April 1965: Charles de Gaulle, President of France (1959–1969)
28 September 1965: Prince Hitachi of Japan
 8 February 1966: Baudouin,  King of Belgium
 16 May 1966: Giuseppe Saragat, President of Italy
10 June 1967: Prince Henrik of Denmark
3 February 1968: Prince Richard of Sayn-Wittgenstein-Berleburg
 18 June 1968: King Albert II of the Belgians (at that time: Albert, Prince of Liège, Prince of Belgium)
 15 January 1970: Asfa Wossen Haile Selassie, Crown Prince of Ethiopia
 9 June 1970: Gustav Heinemann, President of West Germany
 2 September 1970: Kristján Eldjárn,  President of Iceland

Queen Margrethe II of Denmark (14 January 1972 - ) 
14 January 1972: Crown Prince Frederik of Denmark
14 January 1972: Prince Joachim of Denmark
16 January 1973: Princess Christina, Mrs Magnuson
12 February 1973: Queen Sonja of Norway
16 April 1974: Anne, Princess of Denmark
30 April 1974: King Charles III of the United Kingdom of Great Britain and Northern Ireland (Then the Prince of Wales)
29 October 1974: Josip Broz Tito, President of Yugoslavia
29 October 1975: Former Queen Beatrix of the Netherlands
29 October 1975: Claus, Prince Consort of Netherlands
22 November 1976: Grand Duke Jean of Luxembourg
22 November 1976: Joséphine-Charlotte, Grand Duchess of Luxembourg
12 October 1978: Valéry Giscard d'Estaing, President of France (1974-1981)
8 November 1978: Giovanni Leone, President of Italy
3 April 1979: Rudolf Kirchschläger,  President of Austria (1974-1986)
17 March 1980: King Juan Carlos I of Spain
17 March 1980: Queen Sofía of Spain
25 February 1981: Vigdís Finnbogadóttir, former President of the Republic of Iceland
21 April 1981: Nagako, Empress of Japan
28 April 1982: François Mitterrand,  President of France (1981-1995)
20 April 1983: Mauno Henrik Koivisto, former President of the Republic of Finland
18 March 1984: Fahd,  King of Saudi Arabia
25 June 1984: António Santos Ramalho Eanes, former President of the Portuguese Republic
3 September 1985: Queen Silvia of Sweden
19 February 1986: Mohamed Hosni Mubarak, President of the Arab Republic of Egypt
15 February 1988: Hassan II,  King of Morocco
25 April 1989: Richard von Weizsäcker, former President of the Federal Republic of Germany
17 October 1989: Birendra, King of Nepal
20 July 1991: Crown Prince Haakon of Norway
6 May 1992: Mário Alberto Nobre Lopes Soares, former President of the Portuguese Republic
13 October 1992: Princess Märtha Louise of Norway
5 July 1993: Lech Wałęsa, former President of the Republic of Poland
19 October 1993: Oscar Luigi Scalfaro, President of Italy
12 April 1994: Lennart Meri, President of Estonia
7 September 1994: Martti Ahtisaari, former President of the Republic of Finland
16 May 1995: Queen Paola of the Belgians
14 July 1995: Crown Princess Victoria of Sweden
17 November 1995: Alexandra, Countess of Frederiksborg
18 February 1996: Nelson Mandela, President of the Republic of South Africa
9 October 1996: Algirdas Brazauskas, President of Lithuania
18 November 1996: Ólafur Ragnar Grímsson, former President of the Republic of Iceland
14 January 1997: Crown Prince Pavlos of Greece, Prince of Denmark
18 March 1997: Guntis Ulmanis, former President of the Republic of Latvia
31 January 1998: Prince Willem-Alexander of the Netherlands, Prince of Orange
27 April 1998: Hussein,  King of Jordan
27 April 1998: Queen Noor al-Hussein of the Hashemite Kingdom of Jordan
2 June 1998: Empress Michiko of Japan
3 May 1999: Fernando Henrique Cardoso, former President of the Federative Republic of Brazil
23 May 2000: Emil Constantinescu, former President of the Republic of Romania
17 October 2000: Petar Stoyanov, former President of the Republic of Bulgaria
15 December 2000 Mærsk Mc-Kinney Møller, ship owner
7 February 2001: Crown Prince Vajiralongkorn of Thailand
3 April 2001: Tarja Halonen, former President of the Republic of Finland
10 October 2001: Milan Kučan, former President of the Republic of Slovenia
24 April 2002: Johannes Rau, President of Germany
28 May 2002: Prince Philippe of Belgium, Duke of Brabant
20 October 2003: Grand Duke Henri, Grand Duke of Luxembourg
20 October 2003: Grand Duchess Maria Teresa
16 March 2004: Ion Iliescu, former President of Romania
9 May 2004: Crown Princess Mary of Denmark
16 November 2004: Crown Prince Naruhito of Japan
29 March 2006: Georgi Parvanov, former President of the Republic of Bulgaria
24 May 2006: Karolos Papoulias, President of the Hellenic Republic
12 September 2007: Luiz Inácio Lula da Silva, former President of the Federative Republic of Brazil 
8 October 2007: Roh Moo-hyun, President of South Korea
18 February 2008: Felipe Calderón Hinojosa, former President of the United Mexican States
24 May 2008: Princess Marie of Denmark, wife of Prince Joachim of Denmark 
11 May 2011: Lee Myung-bak, former President of South Korea
23 October 2012: Ivan Gašparovič, former President of Slovakia
4 April 2013: Sauli Niinistö, President of the Republic of Finland
17 May 2014: Mette-Marit, Crown Princess of Norway
17 March 2015: Queen Máxima of the Netherlands
13 April 2016: Enrique Peña Nieto, former President of the United Mexican States
24 January 2017: Guðni Thorlacius Jóhannesson, current President of Iceland
28 March 2017: Queen Mathilde of Belgium
28 August 2018: Emmanuel Macron, current President of the French Republic
10 November 2021: Frank-Walter Steinmeier, current President of the Federal Republic of Germany 
21 January 2022: Princess Ingrid Alexandra of Norway

By country 
Persons in bold characters are alive members

2 April 1653: Prince George of Denmark
 11 October 1663: Frederik Ahlefeldt
 25 October 1671: John Adolphus, Duke of Schleswig-Holstein-Sonderburg-Plön
 29 May 1676: Augustus, Duke of Schleswig-Holstein-Sonderburg-Plön-Norburg
 28 January 1768: Future Frederick VI, King of Denmark
 16 November 1787: Future Christian VIII, King of Denmark
 19 December 1811: Friedrich Wilhelm, Duke of Schleswig-Holstein-Sonderburg-Glücksburg
 28 October 1817: Future Frederick VII, King of Denmark
 22 June 1843: Future Christian IX, King of Denmark
 18 September 1843: Friedrich, Duke of Schleswig-Holstein-Sonderburg-Glücksburg
 3 June 1861: Future Frederick VIII, King of Denmark
 15 November 1863: Prince Valdemar of Denmark
 9 March 1864: Prince Johann of Schleswig-Holstein-Sonderburg-Glücksburg
 13 October 1864: Prince Julius of Schleswig-Holstein-Sonderburg-Glücksburg
 8 April 1876: Friedrich Ferdinand, Duke of Schleswig-Holstein
 26 September 1888: Future Christian X, King of Denmark, when he was Christian IX's grandson
 26 May 1892: Louise, Queen Consort of Denmark (Christian IX of Denmark's wife)
 26 May 1892: , Grand Hofmarschall of Denmark
 12 May 1893: Johannes Nellemann, Justice Minister of Denmark
 28 July 1894: Harald, Prince of Denmark (Christian IX of Denmark's grandson)
 28 July 1894: , Justice of the Supreme Court of Denmark
 8 April 1898: Niels Frederik Ravn, Marine & Foreign Minister of Denmark
 4 March 1905: Gustav, Prince of Denmark
 10 June 1905: Aage, Prince of Denmark, later Count of Rosenborg
 12 August 1906: Axel, Prince of Denmark
 31 October 1906: Louise, Queen of Denmark (Fr VIII's Consort), née Princess of Sweden (and Norway)
 3 June 1908: 
 8 November 1908: Erik, Prince of Denmark, later Count of Rosenborg
 27 March 1911: Johannes Zeuthen Schroll, Danish General
 25 December 1911: Viggo, Prince of Denmark, later Count of Rosenborg
 25 January 1912: Vilhelm Thomsen, Danish Linguist
 14 May 1912: Frederik, Crown Prince of Denmark, later King Frederick IX of Denmark
 14 May 1912: Knud, Hereditary Prince of Denmark, Prince of Denmark (until the change in succession law)
 26 September 1912: Queen Alexandrine née Mecklenburg-Schwerin (Christian X's wife, only received the order insignia)
 12 February 1919: Hans Niels Andersen
 30 October 1923: Tage Reedtz-Thott, Baron, former Council President of Denmark
 24 February 1937: Prince Gorm of Denmark (Christian X's nephew)
 16 April 1938: George, Prince of Denmark,
 9 March 1940: Flemming, Prince of Denmark, later Count of Rosenborg
 10 March 1941: Oluf, Prince of Denmark, later Count of Rosenborg
 20 April 1947:  Princess Margrethe of Denmark, now Margrethe II of Denmark, Sovereign of the Order
 20 April 1947: Princess Benedikte of Denmark
 20 April 1947: Queen Anne-Maria, former Queen of the Hellenes, Princess of Denmark
 24 May 1947: Ingrid, Queen of Denmark, née Princess of Sweden (only awarded the order insignia)
 17 October 1947: Niels Bohr, Danish Nobel Prize in Physics
 Before 1958: Princess Ingeborg of Denmark
 3 September 1960: Caroline-Mathilde, Hereditary Princess of Denmark
 17 February 1961: Count Ingolf of Rosenborg, former Prince of Denmark
 11 March 1961: Eleanor, Countess of Rosenborg, formerly Princess of Denmark
 11 March 1962: Princess Elisabeth of Denmark
 20 October 1963: Christian, Count of Rosenborg, formerly Prince of Denmark
 10 June 1967: Prince Henrik of Denmark
 3 February 1968: Prince Richard of Sayn-Wittgenstein-Berleburg
 14 January 1972: Crown Prince Frederik of Denmark
 14 January 1972: Prince Joachim of Denmark
 16 April 1974: Anne, Princess of Denmark
 17 November 1995: Alexandra, Countess of Frederiksborg
 15 December 2000 Mærsk Mc-Kinney Møller, ship owner
 9 May 2004: Crown Princess Mary of Denmark
 24 May 2008: Princess Marie of Denmark, wife of Prince Joachim of Denmark

Since King George I of Greece (born Prince William of Denmark), the Prince(sse)s of Greece are named "Prince(sse)s of Greece and Denmark"

  (1832–1924; 1935–1941; 1944–1974)
 2 November 1846: Otto I, King of Greece
 6 June 1863: Georg I, King of Greece
 28 August 1886: Constantine I, King of Greece, George I's eldest son
 15 November 1888: George, Prince of Greece and Denmark, George I's 2nd son
 7 September 1890: Nicholas, Prince of Greece and Denmark, George I's 3rd son
 6 August 1902: Andrew, Prince of Greece and Denmark, George I's 4th son
 29 July 1909: Christopher, Prince of Greece and Denmark, George I's 5th son
 15 August 1909: George II, King of Greece, Constantine I's eldest son
 7 August 1927: Paul, King of Greece, Constantine I's 3rd son
 26 November 1934: Peter, Prince of Greece and Denmark, Prince George's son
 4 January 1962: King Constantine II, former King of the Hellenes, King Paul's son
 23 January 1963: Frederica, Queen of Greece
 11 September 1964: Princess Irene of Greece and Denmark, Constantine II's sister
 11 September 1964: Prince Michael of Greece and Denmark, Prince Christopher's son
N.B.  Princess Sofia of Greece and Denmark, later Queen Sofía of Spain (17 March 1980), see Spain
 
 14 January 1997: Crown Prince Pavlos of Greece, Prince of Denmark
 24 May 2006: Karolos Papoulias, former President of the Hellenic Republic

Europe

(1804–1867)
 12 November 1814: Francis II, Holy Roman Emperor, Emperor Francis I of Austria (1768-{1792-1835}))
 7 December 1814: Clemens Wenzel Fürst von Metternich, Foreign Minister of Austria
 30 April 1815: Karl Philipp Fürst zu Schwarzenberg, Field Marshal of Austria
 1 February 1831: Ferdinand I, Emperor of Austria, King of Hungary and  Croatia
 17 January 1849: Franz Joseph I, Emperor of Austria, King of Hungary
 28 October 1849: Felix zu Schwarzenberg, Prime Minister of  Austria
 28 October 1849: Joseph Radetzky von Radetz, Field Marshal of Austria
 11 June 1852: Count Karl Ferdinand von Buol-Schauenstein, Foreign Minister of Austria
  (1867–1918)
 24 November 1873: Rudolf, Crown Prince of Austria-Hungary
 16 November 1879: Konstantin of Hohenlohe-Schillingsfürst, First Grand Hofmeister of Austria-Hungary
 16 November 1879: Franz Folliot de Crenneville, Armourer of Austria-Hungary
 19 September 1881: Albrecht, Archduke of Austria-Hungary, Duke of Teschen
 18 May 1889: Gustav Kálnoky, Foreign Minister of Austria-Hungary
 21 July 1890: Karl Ludwig, Archduke of Austria-Hungary
 18 August 1890: Charles Stephen, Archduke of Austria-Hungary
 26 May 1892: Friedrich, Archduke of Austria-Hungary, Duke of Teschen
 12 May 1908: Franz Ferdinand, Archduke of Austria-Hungary
  (1955-)
 6 June 1962: Adolf Schärf, President of Austria (1890-{1957–1965})
 3 April 1979: Rudolf Kirchschläger,  President of Austria (1915-{1974-1986}-2000)

16 June 1846: Leopold I, King of the Belgians
 9 January 1866: Leopold II, King of the Belgians
 1 November 1875: Philippe, Prince of Belgium, Count of Flanders
 23 February 1910: Albert I, King of the Belgians
 27 October 1919: Leopold III, King of the Belgians (At that time : Léopold, Duke of Brabant, Prince of Belgium)
 9 November 1926: Charles, Prince of Belgium, Count of Flanders
 8 February 1966: Baudouin, King of the Belgians
 18 June 1968: King Albert II of the Belgians (at that time: Albert, Prince of Liège, Prince of Belgium)
 16 May 1995: Queen Paola of the Belgians
 28 May 2002: Prince Philippe of Belgium, Duke of Brabant
 28 March 2017: Queen Mathilde of Belgium

Principality of Bulgaria (1878–1908)
 6 July 1883: Alexander I, Prince of Bulgaria (1879–1886)
  (1908–1946)
 20 May 1910: Ferdinand I, Prince of Bulgaria (1887–1908) and Tsar of Bulgaria (1908–1918)
  (1990 - )
 17 October 2000: Petar Stoyanov, President of the Republic of Bulgaria (1997-2002)
 29 March 2006: Georgi Parvanov, President of the Republic of Bulgaria (2002-2012)

12 April 1994: Lennart Meri, President of Estonia

N.B. : Alexander Sergeyevich Menshikov (2 June 1848), see Russia
 18 February 1919: Carl Gustaf Mannerheim, Regent and former President of Finland
 7 October 1926: Lauri Kristian Relander, former President of Finland
 17 November 1950: Juho Kusti Paasikivi, former President of Finland
 3 September 1957: Urho Kekkonen, former President of Finland
 20 April 1983: Mauno Henrik Koivisto, former President of the Republic of Finland
 7 September 1994: Martti Ahtisaari, former President of the Republic of Finland
 3 April 2001: Tarja Halonen, former President of the Republic of Finland
4 April 2013: Sauli Niinistö, President of the Republic of Finland

First French Empire (1804–1814)
 18 May 1808: Napoleon I, Emperor of France
 29 August 1808: Louis Bonaparte, King of Holland
 4 February 1811: Jean-Pierre Bachasson, Count of Montalivet, French Minister of Interior
 4 February 1811: Nicolas François, Count Mollien, French Minister of Finance
 4 February 1811: Antoine Jean Auguste Durosnel, French General
 22 March 1811: Jérôme Bonaparte, King of Westphalia
 Bourbon Restoration (1814-1815-1830)
 25 January 1818: Louis XVIII, King of France (1755-{1814-1815-1824})
 5 December 1818: Armand-Emmanuel du Plessis de Richelieu, Prime Minister of France (1815 – 29 December 1818; 1820–1821)
 10 July 1819: Jean-Joseph, Marquis Dessolles, Prime Minister of France (December 1818 – November 1819)
 2 October 1824: Charles X, King of France (1757-{1824-1830}-1836)
 July Monarchy (1830–1848)
 30 April 1846: Louis Philippe I, King of France (1773-{1830–1848}-1850)
 27 June 1846: François Guizot, Foreign Minister of France
 27 June 1846: Élie, Duke Decazes, Duke of Glücksbjerg
 Second French Empire (1852–1870)
 2 August 1855: Napoleon III, Emperor of France (1808-{1852–1870}-1873)
 28 November 1855: François Certain de Canrobert
 24 September 1856: Prince Napoléon-Jérôme Bonaparte
 11 March 1865: Louis Napoleon, Imperial Crown Prince of France (1856–1879)
 16 May 1866: Edouard Drouyn de Lhuys, Foreign Minister of France (1848–1849, 1851, 1852–1855, 1862–1866) °
 4 May 1869: Patrice Mac-Mahon, Former Marshal of France, President of France (1873-1879) °
 French Third Republic (1870–1940)
 22 January 1876: Louis, duc de Decazes, Foreign Minister of France (1873–1877) °
 14 September 1885:  Robert Philippe, Prince of Orléans, Duke of Chartres (Prince Valdemar of Denmark's father-in-law).
 22 October 1885: (Louis) Philippe, Prince of Orléans, Count of Paris
 5 August 1891: Sadi Carnot, President of France (1887-1894)
 1 November 1900: Émile Loubet, President of France (1899-1906) °
 14 June 1907: Clément Armand Fallières, President of France (1906-1913) °
 16 May 1914: Raymond Poincaré, President of France (1913-1920) °
 8 December 1920: Alexandre Millerand, President of France (1920-resignation 1924) °
 12 March 1927 : Gaston Doumergue, President of France (1924-1931) °
 6 October 1930 : Prince Jean, Duke of Guise, Orléanist claimant to the headship of the Royal Family of France &  (Robert's son, 1885)
 25 January 1932 : Paul Doumer, President of France (1931-1932)
 17 February 1933 : Albert Lebrun, President of France (1932-de facto 1940) °
 French Fourth Republic (1946–1958)
 28 November 1950: Vincent Auriol, President of France (1947-1954)
 15 May 1955: René Coty, President of France (1954-1959)
 French Fifth Republic (1958 - )
 5 April 1965: Charles de Gaulle, President of France (1959-1969), died 9 November 1970 °
 12 October 1978: Valéry Giscard d'Estaing, former President of the French Republic (1974-1981) °
 28 April 1982: François Mitterrand,  President of France (1981-1995), died 8 January 1996 °
 28 August 2018: Emmanuel Macron, current President of the French Republic

19 August 1873: Frederick III, German Emperor
 28 November 1879: Wilhelm II, German Emperor
 30 July 1888: Henry, Prince of Prussia  (Wilhelm II's brother)
 25 August 1888: Alexander August Wilhelm von Pape, Governor of Berlin
 6 May 1900: Wilhelm, Crown Prince of Germany and Prussia (Wilhelm II's elder son)
 3 April 1903: August zu Eulenburg, Prussian General
 29 August 1903: Friedrich Heinrich, Prince of Prussia (elder son of Albert of Prussia & great-grandson Frederick William III of Prussia)
 8 April 1905: Friedrich Wilhelm, Prince of Prussia (3rd son of Albert of Prussia & great-grandson Frederick William III of Prussia)
 21 July 1905: Hans von Koester, German Grand Admiral
 19 November 1906: Prince Eitel Friedrich of Prussia (Wilhelm II's 2nd son)
 19 November 1906: Bernhard von Bülow, Chancellor of German Empire
 3 July 1907: Prince Adalbert of Prussia  (Wilhelm II's 3rd son)
 15 June 1912 : Prince August Wilhelm of Prussia (Wilhelm II's 4th son)
 25 February 1913 : Prince Oskar of Prussia (Wilhelm II's 5th son)
 25 February 1913 : Theobald von Bethmann Hollweg, German Chancellor
  (1949–1990)
 9 June 1970 : Gustav Heinemann, President of West Germany
  (1990-)
 25 April 1989 : Richard von Weizsäcker, former President of the Federal Republic of Germany
 24 April 2002 : Johannes Rau, President of Germany
 10 November 2021 : Frank-Walter Steinmeier, President of Germany

Formerly reigning German local dynasties 
 
 25 December 1840: Leopold IV, Duke of Anhalt
 22 March 1873: Friedrich I, Duke of Anhalt
 14 July 1902: Friedrich II, Duke of Anhalt, when Hereditary Prince of Anhalt
 
 8 November 1825: Ludwig I of Bavaria
 18 May 1891: Luitpold, Prince Regent of Bavaria
 Ludwig III of Bavaria
 25 April 1907: Prince Ferdinand of Bavaria
 
 26 July 1682: Frederick VII, markgreve of Baden-Durlach
 29 January 1769: Charles Louis, Margrave of Baden
 9 September 1811: Charles, Grand Duke of Baden
 16 March 1819: Ludwig I, Grand Duke of Baden
 17 July 1830: Leopold I, Grand Duke of Baden
 24 April 1877: Frederick I, Grand Duke of Baden
 13 October 1897: Frederick II, Grand Duke of Baden
 10 July 1900: Maximilian, Prince of Baden
 26 April 1930: Berthold, Margrave of Baden (Prince Andrew of Greece and Denmark's son-in-law)
 
 7 July 1838: Ernest Augustus, King of Hanover
 23 November 1851: George V of Hanover
 16 November 1878: Ernest Augustus, Crown Prince of Hanover
 9 October 1898: George William, Prince of Hanover and Cumberland
 17 November 1905: Ernst August III, Duke of Brunswick, when Hereditary Prince of Brunswick (and Hanover)
 19 January 1939: Ernst Augustus IV of Hanover
 
 6 June 1731: Charles I, Landgrave of Hesse-Philippsthal
 1801: Prince Frederik of Hesse
 1803: Prince Christian of Hesse
 16 April 1821: William II, Elector of Hesse
 28 June 1840: Prince Frederick William of Hesse-Kassel
 29 January 1848: Frederick William, Elector of Hesse
 2 October 1871: Frederick William III, Landgrave of Hesse
 20 November 1875: Prince Alexander of Hesse and by Rhine
 23 September 1878: Louis IV, Grand Duke of Hesse
 29 October 1884: Alexander Frederick, Landgrave of Hesse-Kassel
 24 June 1895: Frederick Charles, Prince of Hessen-Kassel (later King Elect of Finland (1918) )
 
 28 February 1703: Frederick William, Duke of Mecklenburg-Schwerin
 30 April 1737: Christian Ludwig II, Duke of Mecklenburg-Schwerin
 28 September 1762: Frederick II, Duke of Mecklenburg-Schwerin
 11 October 1774: Duke Louis of Mecklenburg-Schwerin (Christian Ludwig II)
 24 August 1775: Frederick Francis I, Grand Duke of Mecklenburg-Schwerin, when Prince
 24 September 1838: Paul Frederick, Grand Duke of Mecklenburg-Schwerin
 14 July 1841: Duke Gustav Wilhelm of Mecklenburg-Schwerin (de), Prince of Mecklenburg-Schwerin (Frederick Francis I's 2nd son)
 5 April 1842: Frederick Francis II, Grand Duke of Mecklenburg-Schwerin
 17 July 1894: Frederick Francis III, Grand Duke of Mecklenburg-Schwerin
 3 August 1897: Frederick Francis IV, Grand Duke of Mecklenburg-Schwerin
 9 June 1898: John Albert, Duke of Mecklenburg-Schwerin
 3 August 1904: Paul Friedrich, Duke of Mecklenburg(-Schwerin)
 23 August 1924: Duke Adolf Friedrich of Mecklenburg, elected Duke of the United Baltic Duchy (1918)
 7 June 1929: Friedrich Franz, Hereditary Grand Duke of Mecklenburg-Schwerin (nephew of Queen Alexandrine and Christian X)
 
 6 June 1731: Adolphus Frederick III, Duke of Mecklenburg-Strelitz
 4 March 1769: George Augustus, Prince of Mecklenburg-Strelitz
 20 January 1776: Ernest Gottlob, Prince of Mecklenburg-Strelitz
 28 September 1838: George, Grand Duke of Mecklenburg-Strelitz (Frederick VII of Denmark's father-in-law)
 17 October 1860: Frederick William, Grand Duke of Mecklenburg-Strelitz (Frederick VII of Denmark's brother-in-law)
 1 September 1868: George, Duke of Mecklenburg-Strelitz (Grand Duke George's 2nd son &  Frederick VII of Denmark's brother-in-law)
 19 August 1904: Adolf Friedrich V, Grand Duke of Mecklenburg-Strelitz
 
 29 July 1829: Augustus, Grand Duke of Oldenburg
 2 April 1853: Peter II, Grand Duke of Oldenburg
 26 May 1892: Prince Albrecht of Schleswig-Holstein-Sonderburg-Glücksburg (Christian IX of Denmark's nephew)
 12 September 1901: Peter, Count of Oldenburg
 28 April 1909: Frederick Augustus II, Grand Duke of Oldenburg
 24 January 1937: Frederick II, Duke of Schleswig-Holstein, Head of the House of Oldenburg
 
 31 August 1814: Frederick William III of Prussia
 4 July 1815: Gebhard Leberecht von Blücher
 19 January 1840: Frederick William IV of Prussia
 27 February 1841: William I, German Emperor
 11 June 1852: Otto Theodor von Manteuffel
 26 May 1853: Prince Charles of Prussia
   Principalities of Reuss
 3 August 1904: , (1847-1911)
 
 14 September 1900: Frederick, Prince of Schaumburg-Lippe
 17 March 1932: Christian, Prince of Schaumburg-Lippe (Princess Louise of Denmark's son, so Christian X's nephew)
 5 May 1896: Georg, Prince of Schaumburg-Lippe
 
 28 October 1882: Ernst I, Duke of Saxe-Altenburg
 
 16 June 1906: Charles Edward, Duke of Saxe-Coburg and Gotha
 
 1 July 1878: Charles Alexander, Grand Duke of Saxe-Weimar-Eisenach
 
 14 June 1878: Albert of Saxony, King of Saxony
 
 1 February 1817: William I, King of Württemberg
 21 June 1889: Karl I, King of Württemberg

16 February 1940: Miklós Horthy, Regent of Hungary

5 April 1954: Ásgeir Ásgeirsson, former President of Iceland
 2 September 1970: Kristján Eldjárn, former President of Iceland
 25 February 1981: Vigdís Finnbogadóttir, former President of Iceland
 18 November 1996: Ólafur Ragnar Grímsson, former President of Iceland
 24 January 2017: Guðni Thorlacius Jóhannesson, current President of Iceland

2 September 1861: Victor Emmanuel II, King of Italy
 19 August 1863: Umberto I, King of Italy, when Crown Prince
 19 August 1863: Amedeo, Prince of Italy and King of Spain
 23 September 1891: Victor Emmanuel III, King of Italy, when Crown Prince
 31 August 1922: Umberto II of Italy, when Crown Prince of Italy
 
 20 April 1964: Antonio Segni, President of Italy
 16 May 1966: Giuseppe Saragat, President of Italy
 8 November 1978: Giovanni Leone, President of Italy
 19 October 1993: Oscar Luigi Scalfaro, President of Italy

Formerly reigning Families of the Pre-Unification States 
 
 9 June 1921: Prince René of Bourbon-Parma, Prince Valdemar of Denmark's son-in-law.

  4 August 1829: Ferdinand II of the Two Sicilies

  
 18 March 1997: Guntis Ulmanis, former President of the Republic of Latvia  
 9 October 1996: Algirdas Brazauskas, President of Lithuania

  
Kings of Netherlands from William I to William III are also Grand Duke of Luxembourg, see Netherlands
 1 February 1840: Adolphe of Nassau, Duke of Nassau & Grand Duke of Luxembourg
 23 April 1876: William IV, Grand Duke of Luxembourg
 21 March 1955: Charlotte, Grand Duchess of Luxembourg
 22 November 1976: Grand Duke Jean of Luxembourg
 22 November 1976: Joséphine-Charlotte, Grand Duchess of Luxembourg
 20 October 2003: Grand Duke Henri, Grand Duke of Luxembourg 20 October 2003: Grand Duchess Maria Teresa  
 23 March 1929: Louis II, Reigning Prince of Monaco

  
 18 May 1889: Nikola I, Prince of Montenegro (later King of Montenegro)

  
 24 August 1849: William III, King of the Netherlands and Grand Duke of Luxembourg
 12 August 1868: William, Prince of Orange, Crown Prince of the Netherlands (William III's son)
 4 July 1874: Alexander, Prince of Orange, Crown Prince of the Netherlands (William III's son)
 12 December 1912: Henry, Prince Consort of the Netherlands
 5 September 1922: Wilhelmina, Queen of Netherlands (only received the order insignia)
 5 April 1946: Juliana, retired Queen of the Netherlands (only awarded the order insignia)
 5 April 1946: Bernhard, Prince Consort of the Netherlands
 29 October 1975: Queen Beatrix of the Netherlands 29 October 1975: Claus, Prince Consort of the Netherlands
 31 January 1998: Prince Willem-Alexander of the Netherlands, Prince of Orange 17 March 2015: Máxima, Queen Consort of the Netherlands  
 3 August 1890: Haakon VII, King of Norway, when he was "Carl, Prince of Denmark"
 13 August 1921: Olav V, King of Norway
 21 February 1958: King Harald V of Norway 12 February 1973: Queen Sonja of Norway 20 July 1991: Crown Prince Haakon of Norway 13 October 1992: Princess Märtha Louise of Norway 17 May 2014: Mette-Marit, Crown Princess of Norway 21 January 2022: Princess Ingrid Alexandra of Norway  
 20 December 1923: Stanisław Wojciechowski, President of Poland 5 July 1993: Lech Wałęsa, former President of the Republic of Poland  
  10 August 1824: John VI, King of Portugal
 12 April 1841: Fernando II, King of Portugal
 18 April 1864: Luís I, King of Portugal
 1 May 1868: António José de Ávila, Prime Minister of Portugal
 7 October 1883: Carlos I, King of Portugal
 24 March 1909: Manuel II, King of Portugal
  25 June 1984: António Santos Ramalho Eanes, former President of the Portuguese Republic 6 May 1992: Mário Alberto Nobre Lopes Soares, former President of the Portuguese Republic

  
  (1881–1947) 10 May 1879: Carol, Prince of Romania (proclaimed King of Romania in 1881)
 8 January 1908: Ferdinand I, King of Romania, when Crown Prince
  (modern republic, 1989 -) 23 May 2000: Emil Constantinescu, former President of the Republic of Romania 16 March 2004: Ion Iliescu, former President of Romania  
  18 February 1713: Peter the Great, Tsar of Russia
 2 July 1808: Alexander I, Tsar of Russia
 24 January 1826: Nicholas I, Tsar of Russia
 23 April 1834: Alexander II of Russia, Tsar of Russia (Nicholas I's elder son)
 20 September 1859: Nicholas Alexandrovich, Tsarevich, Grand Duke of Russia  (Alexander II's elder son)
 29 June 1865: Alexander III, Grand Duke then Tsar of Russia (Alexander II's 2nd son)
 18 May 1884: Nicholas II, Grand Duke then Tsar of Russia (Alexander III's elder son)
 9 October 1889: George Alexandrovich, Grand Duke of Russia (Alexander III's 3rd son)
 6 August 1897: Michael Alexandrovich, Grand Duke of Russia (Alexander III's 4th son)
 14 June 1866: Vladimir Alexandrovich, Grand Duke of Russia (Alexander II's 3rd son)
 18 October 1928: Cyril Vladimirovich, Grand Duke of Russia
 17 June 1866: Alexei Alexandrovich, Grand Duke of Russia (Alexander II's 4th son)
 3 August 1876: Sergei Alexandrovich, Grand Duke of Russia (Alexander II's 5th son)
 3 August 1876: Paul Alexandrovich, Grand Duke of Russia (Alexander II's 6th son)
 23 July 1844: Konstantin Nikolayevich, Grand Duke of Russia (Nicholas I's 2nd son)
 25 June 1875: Konstantin Konstantinovich of Russia, Grand Duke of Russia (Konstantin Nikolayevich's 2nd son)
 1 September 1868: Nicholas Nikolaevich, Grand Duke of Russia (Nicholas I's 3rd son)
 19 July 1909: Nicholas Nikolaevich, Grand Duke of Russia
 10 September 1881: Michael Nikolaevich, Grand Duke of Russia  (Nicholas I's 4th son)
 18 November 1897: Nicholas Mikhailovich, Grand Duke of Russia (Michael Nikolaevich's elder son)
 7 September 1900: George Mikhailovich, Grand Duke of Russia (Michael Nikolaevich's 3rd son)
 7 September 1895: Alexander Mikhailovich, Grand Duke of Russia (Michael Nikolaevich's 4th son)
  personalities Reign of Peter the Great (7 May 1682 – 8 February 1725)'  22 February 1710: Aleksandr Danilovich Menshikov, Prince and Field Marshal of Russia
 16 June 1713: Anikita Ivanovich Repnin, Noble Prince and General of Russia
 16 June 1713: Prince Vasily Vladimirovich Dolgorukov. Fell into disfavor in 1718, order returned in 1719. Awarded the order again in 1726, deprived for the second time in 1732, and again assigned in 1742  'Once received the order, 3 times given.
 Reign Alexander I of Russia (24 March 1801 – 1 December 1825) 9 February 1808: Alexander Borisovich, Prince Kurakin, Russian Foreign Minister.
 1 January 1815: Levin August, Count von Bennigsen, Russian general
 1 September 1819: Carl Robert, Count von Nesselrode, Foreign Minister of Russia
 1 September 1819: Ioannis Antonios, Count Kapodistrias, Foreign Minister of Russia (1816–1822)
 Reign of Nicholas I of Russia (1 December 1825 – 2 March 1855) 28 January 1844: Prince Pyotr Mikhailovich Volkonsky, Russian General-Field Marshal, Min. of Imp. Court and Properties (1826 - 1852)
 2 June 1848: Prince Alexander Sergeyevich Menshikov, Russian Marine Minister and General-Governor of Grand-Duchy of Finland
 Reign of Alexander II of Russia (2 March 1855 – 13 March 1881) 16 September 1857: Prince Alexander Mikhailovich Gorchakov, Foreign Minister of Russia
 11 October 1864: Count Sergei Stroganov, Russia General
 26 October 1866: Count Vladimir Adlerberg, Russian Minister of the Imperial Court
 26 October 1866: Count Andrej Shuvalov (ru) , Grand Marshal of the Court of Russia
 16 September 1868: Count Georg Meyendorff (ru) , Russian Generalløjtnant
 3 August 1876: Count Alexander Vladimirovich Adlerberg (ru) , Russian Minister of the Imperial Court
 14 August 1876: Prince Vladimir Andreyevich Dolgorukov (ru) , Governor General of Moscow
 19 August 1876: Dmitry Milyutin, Minister of War of Russia
 22 April 1879: Eduard Ivanovich Totleben, Russian General ingenior
 Reign of Alexander III of Russia (13 March 1881 – 1 November 1894) 26 November 1882: Baron Arthur Mohrenheim, Russian envoy in Denmark
 25 October 1888: Nikolay von Giers, Foreign Minister of Russia
 21 December 1891: Prince Illarion Ivanovich Vorontsov-Dashkov, Russian General
 Reign of Nicholas II of Russia (1894–1917) 16 July 1909: Count Vladimir Frederiks, Russian Minister of the Imperial Court

  
  1882–1918 19 May 1882: Milan I, King of Serbia
  1918–1943 26 March 1930: Alexander I, King of Yugoslavia
 7 November 1934: Prince Paul of Yugoslavia, Prince Regent of Yugoslavia (9 October 1934 – 27 March 1941)
  (1943–1992) 29 October 1974: Josip Broz Tito, President of Yugoslavia

  
 24 February 1925: Tomáš Garrigue Masaryk, President of Czechoslovakia
 October 2012 : Ivan Gašparovič, current President of Slovakia  
 10 October 2001: Milan Kučan, former President of the Republic of Slovenia  
 29 August 1818: Ferdinand VII, King of Spain
 21 May 1848: Francis, Duke of Cádiz, married to Isabella II of Spain and titular King of Spain
 Amedeo, King of Spain, see Italy
 8 January 1878: Alfonso XII, King of Spain
 20 July 1901: Alfonso XIII, King of Spain
 6 February 1929: Alfonso, Prince of Asturias (Alfonso XIII of Spain's elder son & Juan Carlos's uncle)
 6 February 1929: Infante Jaime, Duke of Segovia (Alfonso XIII of Spain's 2nd son & Juan Carlos's uncle)
 17 March 1980: King Juan Carlos I of Spain 17 March 1980: Queen Sofía of Spain  
  (-1814) 27 May 1700: Frederick I, King of Sweden
 4 September 1752: Adolf Frederick, King of Sweden
 24 December 1763: , Baron and Privy Council of Sweden
 19 April 1766: Gustav III, King of Sweden
 1 November 1786: Gustav IV Adolf, King of Sweden
  (1814-1905) 10 October 1808: Charles XIV John, King of the United Kingdoms of Sweden and Norway (1818–44), formerly Marshal of France
 28 January 1810: Charles XIII, King of Sweden 1809-1818 and Norway 1814-1818
 1 December 1835: Oscar I, King of the United Kingdoms of Sweden and Norway (1844–59), formerly Duke of Södermanland
 16 July 1846: Charles XV, King of the United Kingdoms of Sweden and Norway (1859–72), formerly Duke of Skåne (Oscar I's elder son)
 27 September 1847: Gustaf, Prince of the United Kingdoms of Sweden and Norway, Duke of Uppland (Oscar I's 2nd son)
 3 June 1848:  Oscar II, King of the United Kingdoms of Sweden and Norway (1872-1905) and of Sweden (1905-1907), formerly Duke of Östergötland (Oscar I's 3rd son)
 2 October 1848: Gustaf Algernon Stierneld, Foreign Minister of the United Kingdoms of Sweden and Norway
 9 June 1852: August, Prince of the United Kingdoms of Sweden and Norway, Duke of Dalarna (Oscar I's 4th son)
 28 July 1869: Gustaf Sparre (justitiestatsminister), Marshal of the Realm
 28 July 1869: Carl Wachtmeister, Foreign Minister of the United Kingdoms of Sweden and Norway
 5 March 1874: Axel Gustaf Adlercreutz, Minister of Justice (Sweden)
 22 June 1874: Gustaf V, King of Sweden (1907–50), formerly Prince of Sweden (and Norway), Duke of Värmland (Oscar II's elder son)
 20 July 1880: Oscar, Prince Bernadotte, formerly Prince of Sweden (and Norway), Duke of Gotland (Oscar II's 2nd son)
 31 August 1883: Carl, Prince of Sweden (and Norway), Duke of Västergötland (Oscar II's 3rd son and Queen Astrid's father)
 31 August 1883: Eugen, Prince of Sweden (and Norway), Duke of Närke (Oscar II's 4th son)
 18 September 1897: Fredrik von Essen, Marshal of the Realm of Sweden
 27 October 1902: Lave Beck-Friis, Swedish envoy to Denmark
 28 October 1903: Gustaf VI Adolf, King of Sweden(1950–73), Pr. of Sweden (and Norway), formerly Duke of Skåne (Gustav V's 1st son)
  (1905 - ) 11 September 1906: Conrad Victor Ankarcrona, Grand Master of Stockholm Palace
 18 December 1907: Wilhelm, Prince of Sweden (and Norway), Duke of Södermanland (Gustav V's 2nd son)
 6 March 1911: Arvid Taube, Foreign Minister of Sweden
 20 November 1912: Erik, Prince of Sweden (and Norway), Duke of Västmanland (Gustav V's 3rd son)
 16 June 1933: Gustaf Adolf, Prince of Sweden, Duke of Västerbotten (Gustaf VI Adolf's son and Carl XVI Gustaf's father)
 5 December 1933: Prince Carl Bernadotte, formerly Prince of Sweden, Duke of Östergötland, (Duke of Västergötland's son)
 21 May 1935: Carl Johan, Count Bernadotte of Wisborg, formerly Prince of Sweden, Duke of Dalarna (Gustav VI's 4th son)
 21 May 1935: Bertil, Prince of Sweden, Duke of Halland (Gustav VI's 3rd son) NB 24. May 1947: Ingrid of Sweden, Queen of Denmark, see Denmark
 28 March 1952: Sigvard, Count Bernadotte of Wisborg, formerly Prince of Sweden, Duke of Uppland (Gustav VI's 2nd son)
 4 September 1960: Margaretha, Prinsess Consort of Denmark, née Princess of Sweden
 12 January 1965: King Carl XVI Gustaf of Sweden 16 January 1973: Princess Christina, Mrs Magnusson 3 September 1985: Queen Silvia of Sweden 14 July 1995: Crown Princess Victoria of Sweden  
   13 December 1884: Abdul Hamid II, Sultan of the Ottoman Empire

  
 4 July 1815: George IV, King of the United Kingdom
 4 July 1815: Arthur Wellesley, 1st Duke of Wellington
 15 July 1830: William IV, King of the United Kingdom and Hanover
 20 January 1843: Albert of Saxe-Coburg-Gotha, Prince Consort of United Kingdom
 16 November 1863: Edward VII, King of United Kingdom and Ireland
 26 March 1867: Prince George, Duke of Cambridge
 2 August 1873: Prince Arthur, Duke of Connaught and Strathearn, Prince of the United Kingdom
 4 July 1875: Alfred of Saxe-Coburg-Gotha, Duke of Edinburgh, Prince of United Kingdom and Ireland
 11 October 1883: Albert Victor, Prince of United Kingdom, Duke of Clarence and Avondale
 11 October 1885: George V, King of United Kingdom and Ireland
 17 March 1914: Prince Edward Albert of United Kingdom, Prince of Wales, later Edward VIII, King of the United Kingdom
 10 May 1914: Prince Arthur of Connaught, Prince of the United Kingdom
 30 November 1920: Prince Albert of United Kingdom, Duke of York, later George VI of the United Kingdom and Ireland
 23 September 1922: Prince George, Duke of Kent, Prince of the United Kingdom
 24 June 1924: Prince Henry, Duke of Gloucester, Prince of the United Kingdom
 5 July 1945: Bernard Montgomery, Field Marshal
 16 November 1947: Princess Elizabeth, Duchess of Edinburgh, later Queen Elizabeth II of the United Kingdom
 16 November 1947: Prince Philip of the United Kingdom, Duke of Edinburgh
 9 October 1950: Winston Churchill, Prime Minister of the United Kingdom
 30 April 1974: Charles, Prince of Wales, now King Charles III of the United Kingdom Africa 

  
  Khedivate of Egypt (1867–1914) 16 May 1859: Muhammad Ali Pasha, Hereditary Prince of Egypt
  Sultanate of Egypt (1914–1922) ---
  (1922–1953) 4 November 1932: Fuad I, King of Egypt
  19 February 1986: Mohamed Hosni Mubarak, President of the Arab Republic of Egypt  
  (-1975)
 21 November 1954: Haile Selassie I, Emperor of Ethiopia
 21 November 1954: Makonnen Haile Selassie, Prince of Ethiopia
 15 January 1970: Asfa Wossen Haile Selassie, Crown Prince of Ethiopia

  
 15 February 1988: Hassan II,  King of Morocco

  
 18 February 1996: Nelson Mandela, President of the Republic of South Africa

  
 9 September 1963: Julius Nyerere, President of Tanzania

  
 4 June 1963: Habib Bourguiba,  President of Tunisia

 America 

  
 29 March 1847: Pedro II, Emperor of Brazil
 14 November 1921: Epitácio Pessoa, President of Brazil
 3 May 1999: Fernando Henrique Cardoso, former President of the Federative Republic of Brazil 12 September 2007: Luiz Inácio Lula da Silva, President of the Federative Republic of Brazil 

  
 11 January 1866: Maximilian I of Mexico
 18 February 2008: Felipe Calderón Hinojosa, former President of the United Mexican States 13 April 2016: Enrique Peña Nieto, former President of the United Mexican States  
 15 December 1945: Dwight D. Eisenhower, later President of United States (made Knight in his capacity of General)

 Asia - Middle East 

  
 Imperial State of Iran
 20 January 1937: Rezā Shāh, Emperor of Iran
 14 May 1959: Mohammad Reza Pahlavi, Shah of Iran
 3 May 1963: Empress Farah, former Empress of Iran  
 27 April 1998: Hussein,  King of Jordan
 27 April 1998: Queen Noor al-Hussein of the Hashemite Kingdom of Jordan  
 18 March 1984: Fahd,  King of Saudi Arabia

 Asia - Far East 

  
 18 May 1887: Mutsuhito, Emperor Meiji of Japan
 9 October 1899: Yoshihito, Emperor Taishō of Japan
 23 January 1923: Hirohito, Emperor Showa of Japan
 3 September 1930: Nobuhito, Prince Takamatsu of Japan
 8 August 1953: Akihito, former Emperor (Heisei) of Japan 5 March 1957: Takahito, Prince Mikasa of Japan
 28 September 1965: Masahito, Prince Hitachi of Japan 21 April 1981: Nagako, Empress Kōjun of Japan
 2 June 1998: Michiko, former Empress of Japan 16 November 2004: Naruhito, Emperor of Japan  
 17 October 1989: Birendra,  King of Nepal

  
 31 August 1903: Emperor Gojong of Korea
 8 October 2007: Roh Moo-hyun, President of South Korea
 11 May 2011: Lee Myung-bak, former President of South Korea  
  (until 1939; 1945-1949) 8 January 1892: Chulalongkorn (Rama V), King of Siam (1853-{1868–1910})
 27 July 1897: Vajiravudh (Rama VI), King of Siam (1881-{1910–1925}), when Crown Prince of Siam
 27 July 1897: Svasti Sobhana, Prince of Siam
 7 August 1911: Chakrabongse Bhuvanath, Prince of Siam
 8 February 1926: Prajadhipok (Rama VII), King of Siam (1893-{1925-1935})
 4 June 1930: Paribatra Sukhumbandhu, Prince of Siam
 4 June 1930: Purachatra Jayakara, Prince of Siam
 13 July 1930: Damrong Rajanubhab, Prince of Siam
  (1939-1945; since 1949 ) 28 November 1952: Chumbhotbongs Paribatra, Prince of Thailand
 21 April 1958: King Bhumibol Adulyadej (Rama IX) of Thailand (1927-(1946 - 2016 )
 6 September 1960: Queen Sirikit of Thailand 7 February 2001: King Vajiralongkorn of Thailand''', when Crown Prince of Thailand

References 

Elephant, Order of the
Orders, decorations, and medals of Denmark
Elephant